Joseph De Lacroix "De De" Pierce (February 18, 1904 – November 23, 1973) was an American jazz trumpeter and cornetist. He is best remembered for the songs "Peanut Vendor" and "Dippermouth Blues", both with Billie Pierce.

Biography
Pierce was born Joseph De Lacroix Pierce in New Orleans, Louisiana, United States. Pierce's first gig was with Arnold Dupas in New Orleans in 1924.

During his time playing in city nightclubs, he met Billie Pierce, who became his wife as well as a musical companion; the two were the house band at the Luthjens Dance Hall from the 1930s through the 1950s. They released several albums together but stopped performing in the middle of the 1950s due to illness, which left De De Pierce blind.

By 1959, they had returned to performing, and De De Pierce toured with Ida Cox and played with the Preservation Hall Jazz Band, before further health problems ended his career.

He died in November 1973, at the age of 69. He received a Catholic jazz funeral.

References

1904 births
1973 deaths
Jazz musicians from New Orleans
American jazz trumpeters
American male trumpeters
American jazz cornetists
Musicians from Louisiana
Blind musicians
20th-century American musicians
20th-century trumpeters
20th-century American male musicians
American male jazz musicians
Preservation Hall Jazz Band members
African-American Catholics